The Cambodia Baptist Union (CBU, also known as the Cambodian Baptist Convention ) is a national cooperative association of Baptist churches in Cambodia.

History
Although Baptist missions have been noted in Cambodia since at least 1953, due to the turbulent contemporary history of Cambodia, the CBU was only organized in 1995 as the Khmer Baptist Convention.

In 1994, the Baptists co-founded the Evangelical Fellowship of Cambodia (EFC) and in 1997, a Baptist Federation was created uniting churches that were planted by Southern Baptists and independent Baptists  and co-founded the Kampuchea Christian Council in August 1998.

Affiliations 

The CBU participates actively in ecumenical relationships through:

 Evangelical Fellowship of Cambodia
 Evangelical Fellowship of Asia
 World Evangelical Alliance
 Kampuchea Christian Council
 Christian Conference of Asia
 World Council of Churches
 Baptist World Alliance
 Asia Pacific Baptist Federation

See also 
 Christianity in Cambodia
 Bible
 Born again
 Baptist beliefs
 Worship service (evangelicalism)
 Jesus Christ
 Believers' Church

References 

Christian organizations established in 1995
Baptist denominations in Asia
Baptist denominations established in the 20th century